Blinn-Pulver Farmhouse is a historic farmhouse in Chatham, New York on Route 66. Gail Blass Wolczanski, of the Chatham Village Historical Society, is working on restoring the run-down farmhouse. The restored farmhouse will be called Historical Society Education Center with a museum, archives, and a library. The farmhouse was added to the National Register of Historic Places in 2003 as Blinn—Pulver Farmhouse.

References

Houses on the National Register of Historic Places in New York (state)
Federal architecture in New York (state)
Houses completed in 1814
Houses in Columbia County, New York
National Register of Historic Places in Columbia County, New York